Turpilia is a genus of phaneropterine katydids in the family Tettigoniidae. There are about nine described species in Turpilia.

Species
These nine species belong to the genus Turpilia:
 Turpilia albineura Zayas, 1965
 Turpilia appendiculata Brunner von Wattenwyl, 1878
 Turpilia obtusangula Brunner von Wattenwyl, 1878
 Turpilia opaca Brunner von Wattenwyl, 1878
 Turpilia plana (Walker, 1869)
 Turpilia punctata Stål, 1874
 Turpilia rostrata (Rehn & Hebard, 1905) (narrow-beaked katydid)
 Turpilia rugulosa Brunner von Wattenwyl, 1878
 Turpilia vigens (Walker, 1869)

References

Further reading

 

Phaneropterinae
Articles created by Qbugbot